"Lonely Teardrops" is a song written by Berry Gordy Jr., Gwen Gordy and Roquel "Billy" Davis, first recorded and released as a single in 1958 by R&B singer Jackie Wilson, on the Brunswick label. The single was commercially successful, reaching the top ten on the Billboard Hot 100, and number-one on the R&B chart. It is ranked as the 57th biggest U.S. hit of 1959.

The Rock and Roll Hall of Fame named it one of "Songs that Shaped Rock and Roll". In 1999, it was inducted into the Grammy Hall of Fame. "Lonely Teardrops" was also ranked #315 on Rolling Stone magazine's list of The 500 Greatest Songs of All Time (2011).

Song information
Written by Berry Gordy Jr., Gwendolyn Gordy (Berry's sister) and Roquel "Billy" Davis, going under the pseudonym Tyran Carlo, the single, alongside Wilson's debuting five consecutive singles between 1957–58, turned Wilson into an R&B superstar and influenced the later careers of Davis, who joined the staff of Chess Records while Gordy used the money from the song's success to form Motown Records within a year. The song raced up to number one on the Billboard R&B chart and became Wilson's first top ten hit on the Billboard Hot 100, eventually peaking at number seven. According to Wilson, it was originally intended by Gordy to be recorded as a ballad.  After recording it, Wilson and Brunswick executives felt the song lacked something.  It was then given to veteran Decca Records arranger Dick Jacobs who re-arranged it into the smash hit it became.

The hit's success helped land Wilson on American Bandstand and The Ed Sullivan Show performing to receptive audiences on the respective shows, as well as other shows such as Shindig and Hullabaloo.

This was the last song Jackie Wilson performed.  He collapsed on-stage from a heart attack, while he was in the middle of the phrase, "My Heart is Crying", while appearing as one of the feature acts in Dick Clark's 'Good Ol' Rock and Roll Revue' in 1975.

Cover versions

 The title was covered by the rhythm and blues singer Chuck Jackson in his solo 1961 album I Don't Want to Cry!. 
 Jay and the Americans covered the song on their 1970 album, Wax Museum. 
 Brian Hyland also recorded a version of the song that reached #54 on the Billboard Hot 100 in 1971.
 In 1975 John Fogerty released a version of it on his solo album John Fogerty. 
 The biggest hit cover version was recorded by country music singer Narvel Felts. His version was released in 1976 and reached #5 on the Billboard Hot Country Singles chart that June. He also reached #62 on the Billboard Hot 100. 
 Victor Wood covered this song on his 1971 album Mr. Lonely.

Covers of the song have also appeared in several films: Michael McDonald covered the song in the early 1990s and his version was used in the film Leaving Las Vegas.  It was also covered by Howard Huntsberry, who portrayed Wilson, for the 1987 biographical movie about Ritchie Valens, La Bamba, and Huey Lewis's performance of the song in the 2000 karaoke-themed film Duets was also released as part of the film's soundtrack.

Charts

See also
Shout (The Isley Brothers song), a call and response answer to the song.
List of number-one R&B singles of 1958 (U.S.)

References

External links
 

1958 singles
Songs written by Berry Gordy
Jackie Wilson songs
Jay and the Americans songs
Brian Hyland songs
Grammy Hall of Fame Award recipients
Songs written by Gwen Gordy Fuqua
1958 songs
Songs written by Billy Davis (songwriter)
Narvel Felts songs
Brunswick Records singles
Songs about loneliness